For information on all Marist College sports, see Marist Red Foxes

The Marist Red Foxes men's basketball team is the basketball team that represents Marist College in Poughkeepsie, New York, United States.  The school's team currently competes in the Metro Atlantic Athletic Conference. The Red Foxes have qualified for the NCAA tournament twice (1986, 1987), losing in the first round in both instances. Prior to joining the MAAC in 1997, Marist was a charter member of the ECAC Metro Conference in 1981; which became the Northeast Conference in 1988.

History
The Marist men's basketball team's first varsity season was 1961–62 at the NCAA Division III level. For 20 years Marist would play at this level. Their most successful season during this time was the 1970–71 season under head coach Ron Petro, in which they went 21–7. The Marist Athletic Department including the men's basketball program transitioned up to the Division I level before the 1981–82 season. In response to the competitive landscape the program encountered in Division I for basketball recruits Marist became one of the first college programs to recruit players from overseas. This strategy worked and Marist was able to attract very talented international players to Poughkeepsie. This led to unprecedented on the court success and national recognition for the school. The most successful Marist men's basketball teams played in the mid-1980s and were composed mostly of players from Europe and Canada. They were led by future first-round selection and NBA All-Star Rik Smits, who was originally from the Netherlands. Also on those teams was Rudy Bourgarel and Alain Forestier from France, Peter Krasovec from Hungary, Curtis Celestine from Canada and Serbian player Miroslav Pecarski. At the time, Pecarski was considered by some to be Europe's top 17-year-old player, but he was injured in the preseason, creating an opportunity for Smits.

During the 1984–85 season, Marist hosted eventual national champion Villanova, losing 57–51. That same year Marist would earn its first ECAC Metro Conference regular season championship. That team was coached by Matthew Furjanic Jr., whose staff also included Jim Todd, who would go on to become head coach of the Los Angeles Clippers.

In 1986 and 1987 Marist won the ECAC Metro Conference tournament and advanced to play in the NCAA tournament. In the 1986 NCAA Tournament, Marist lost 68–53 against a Georgia Tech team which would send four members of its starting lineup to the NBA. The 1987 team was Dave Magarity’s first year as head coach of the Red Foxes. The team won 20 games for the first time in its Division I history and lost to University of Pittsburgh in the NCAA first round. Magarity’s staff included Jeff Bower, formerly the general manager and head coach of the NBA’s New Orleans Hornets.

After graduating, Rik Smits was drafted #2 overall in the first round of the 1988 NBA draft, and become the first Marist player to play in the NBA. He would go on to have a long and successful career with the Indiana Pacers.

Marist lost in the first round of the 1996 NIT to Rhode Island. The 1995–96 team was led by 6'11" center Alan Tomidy, a native of Le Roy, New York and first team all New York Metropolitan, NEC and Haggerty Award Finalist, who averaged 18.8 pts and 11.3 rebounds per game. Other players of note were shooting forward Kareem Hill (13.7 pts and 8.7 rbs/game) and guard Danny Basile (15 pts/game), who combined for 55 points in that NIT loss. 

Since joining the MAAC in 1997, Marist has not won a conference tournament title nor qualified for an NCAA berth, although they won the MAAC regular season title twice (shared 2002, outright 2007). Not coincidentally, each of those teams possessed outstanding guard play; Sean Kennedy in 2002 and Jared Jordan in 2007.

The 2006–07 season featured point guard Jared Jordan, 7' center James Smith and shooting guard Will Whittington. Jordan led the nation in assists for the second straight year while Whittington, a three-point shooting specialist, contributed 17.6 pts/game. Whittington finished his Marist career with 362 three-pointers, and Jordan finished his career with 813 assists, both still program records.

In March, 2007, the men's basketball team defeated Oklahoma State in the first round of the NIT 67–64.

On June 28, 2007, Jared Jordan became the second Marist College basketball player to be selected in the NBA draft, as the 45th overall pick, 15th pick in the second round by the Los Angeles Clippers.

Two Marist players have won the Haggerty Award, Izett Buchanan in 1994 and Jared Jordan in 2007. The award is given annually to the Metropolitan area's top men's Division I basketball player.

Head coaches

On April 10, 2013, Jeff Bower was named the tenth Head Coach in Marist's Division I history replacing Chuck Martin who was fired on March 14.

One June 2, 2014, after leading Marist to a 12–19 record in one season, Bower resigned his position to become General Manager of the Detroit Pistons of the NBA. On June 17, 2014, Mike Maker was hired as the eleventh head coach. Maker was previously the head coach at Division III Williams College where over six seasons he led the Ephs to a 147–32 (.821) record and three Division III Final Fours, twice getting to the title game. However, Maker was fired on March 5, 2018, after winning 28 games over four seasons.

On April 3, 2018, John Dunne was hired as the 12th coach of Marist, being hired from MAAC rival Saint Peter's.

Postseason

NCAA tournament results
The Red Foxes have appeared in two NCAA Tournaments. Their combined record is 0–2.

NIT results
The Red Foxes have appeared in two National Invitation Tournaments. Their combined record is 1–2.

Year-by-year results
Overall total reflects only Division I seasons
{| class="wikitable" style="text-align:center"
! style="background:#C8102E; color:#FFFFFF; | Season
! style="background:#C8102E; color:#FFFFFF; | Overall
! style="background:#C8102E; color:#FFFFFF; | Conference
! style="background:#C8102E; color:#FFFFFF; | Standing
! style="background:#C8102E; color:#FFFFFF; | Postseason
|-
| style="background: #ffffdd; text-align:center;" colspan="5" | Central Atlantic Collegiate Conference
|-
| style="background: #e6e6e6; text-align:center;" colspan="5" | George Sturba (1961–1962)
|-
| 1961–62 || 6–7 ||  ||  || 
|-
| George Sturba (1 yr) ||  || || ||
|-
| style="background: #e6e6e6; text-align:center;" colspan="5" | Tom Wade (1962–1964)
|-
| 1962–63 || 14–9 ||  ||  || 
|-
| 1963–64 || 4–15 ||  ||  || 
|-
| Tom Wade (2 yrs) ||  || || ||
|-
| style="background: #e6e6e6; text-align:center;" colspan="5" | Paul Arnold (1964–1966)
|-
| 1964–65 || 6–17 ||  ||  || 
|-
| 1965–66 || 6–17 ||  ||  || 
|-
| Paul Arnold (2 yrs) ||  || || ||
|-
| style="background: #e6e6e6; text-align:center;" colspan="5" | Ron Petro (1966–1984)
|-
| 1966–67 || 9–16 ||  ||  || 
|-
| 1967–68 || 11–13 || 4–2 ||  || CAAC Champions
|-
| 1968–69 || 17–10 || 7–1 ||  || CAAC Champions
|-
| 1969–70 || 15–9 || 4–2 ||  || 
|-
| 1970–71 || 21–7 || 7–1 ||  || CAAC Champions
|-
| 1971–72 || 16–9 ||  8–2|| || 
|-
| 1972–73 || 15–12 ||  6–4|| || NAIA first round
|-
| 1973–74 || 9–16 ||  3–5|| || 
|-
| 1974–75 || 16–10 ||  6–4|| || 
|-
| 1975–76 || 15–10 ||  9–3|| || 
|-
| 1976–77 || 7–15 ||  5–8|| || 
|-
| 1977–78 || 7–19 || ||  || 
|-
| style="background: #ffffdd; text-align:center;" colspan="5" | Big Apple Conference
|-
| 1978–79 || 8–16 || 4–6 || || First Division II season
|-
| 1979–80 || 9–17 || 4–6 || || 
|-
| 1980–81 || 12–15 || 9–3 || || 
|-
| style="background: #ffffdd; text-align:center;" colspan="5" | ECAC Metro North
|-
| 1981–82 || 12–14 || 6–9 ||  5th|| First Division I season
|-
| 1982–83 || 14–15 || 7–7 ||  4th||
|-
| 1983–84 || 14–15 || 8–8 ||  5th||
|-
| Ron Petro (18 yrs) ||  ||  || ||
|-
| Ron Petro (DI 3 yrs) ||  ||  || ||
|-
| style="background: #e6e6e6; text-align:center;" colspan="5" | Matthew Furjanic Jr. (1984–1986)
|-
| style="background: #ffdd99; text-align:center;" | 1984–85 || style="background: #ffdd99; text-align:center;" | 17–12 || style="background: #ffdd99; text-align:center;" | 11–3 || style="background: #ffdd99; text-align:center;"|  1st || style="background: #ffdd99; text-align:center;" | 
|-
| style="background: #ffff99; text-align:center;" | 1985–86 || style="background: #ffff99; text-align:center;" | 19–12 || style="background: #ffff99; text-align:center;" | 11–5 || style="background: #ffff99; text-align:center;" | 2nd || style="background: #ffff99; text-align:center;" | NCAA round of 64
|-
| Matt Furjanic (2 yrs) ||  ||  || ||
|-
| style="background: #e6e6e6; text-align:center;" colspan="5" | Dave Magarity (1986–2004)
|-
| style="background: #d9a53d; text-align:center;" | 1986–87 || style="background: #d9a53d; text-align:center;" | 20–10 || style="background: #d9a53d; text-align:center;" | 15–1 || style="background: #d9a53d; text-align:center;" | 1st|| style="background: #d9a53d; text-align:center;" | NCAA round of 64
|-
| style="background: #ffdd99; text-align:center;" | 1987–88 || style="background: #ffdd99; text-align:center;" | 18–9 || style="background: #ffdd99; text-align:center;" | 13–3 || style="background: #ffdd99; text-align:center;"|  T-1st ||  style="background: #ffdd99; text-align:center;" | 
|-
| style="background: #ffffdd; text-align:center;" colspan="5" | Northeast Conference
|-
| 1988–89 || 13–15 || 9–7 ||  4th||
|-
| 1989–90 || 17–11 || 10–6 ||  T-3rd||
|-
| 1990–91 || 6–22 || 4–12 ||  T-7th||
|-
| 1991–92 || 10–20 || 6–10 ||  7th||
|-
| 1992–93 || 14–16 || 10–8 ||  T-3rd||
|-
| 1993–94 || 14–13 || 10–8 ||  T-5th||
|-
| 1994–95 || 17–11 || 12–6 ||  T-2nd||
|-
| 1995–96 || 22–7 || 14–4 ||  T-2nd|| NIT 1st Round
|-
| 1996–97 || 6–22 || 4–14 ||  9th||
|-
| style="background: #ffffdd; text-align:center;" colspan="5" | Metro Atlantic Athletic Conference
|-
| 1997–98 || 11–17 || 7–11 ||  T-7th||
|-
| 1998–99 || 16–12 || 8–10 ||  6th||
|-
| 1999–00 || 14–14 || 10–8 ||  T-4th||
|-
| 2000–01 || 17–13 || 11–7 ||  T-4th||
|-
| style="background: #ffdd99; text-align:center;" | 2001–02 || style="background: #ffdd99; text-align:center;" | 19–9 || style="background: #ffdd99; text-align:center;" | 13–5 || style="background: #ffdd99; text-align:center;"|  T-1st ||  style="background: #ffdd99; text-align:center;" | 
|-
| 2002–03 || 13–16 || 8–10 ||  6th||
|-
| 2003–04 || 6–22 || 4–14 ||  9th||
|-
| Dave Magarity (18 yrs) ||  ||  || ||
|-
| style="background: #e6e6e6; text-align:center;" colspan="5" | Matt Brady (2004–2008)
|-
| 2004–05 || 11–17 || 8–10 ||  T-7th||
|-
| 2005–06 || 19–10 || 12–6 ||  3rd||
|-
| style="background: #ffdd99; text-align:center;" | 2006–07 || style="background: #ffdd99; text-align:center;" | 25–9 || style="background: #ffdd99; text-align:center;" | 14–4 || style="background: #ffdd99; text-align:center;" | 1st || style="background: #ffdd99; text-align:center;" | NIT 2nd Round
|-
| 2007–08 || 18–14 || 11–7 ||  T-5th||
|-
| Matt Brady (4 yrs) ||  ||  || ||
|-
| style="background: #e6e6e6; text-align:center;" colspan="5" | Chuck Martin (2008–2013)
|-
| 2008–09 || 10–23 || 4–14 ||  T-9th||
|-
| 2009–10 || 1–29 || 1–17 ||  10th||
|-
| 2010–11 || 6–27 || 3–15 ||  T-9th||
|-
| 2011–12 || 14–18 || 7–11 ||  8th||
|-
| 2012–13 || 10–21 || 6–12 ||  8th||
|-
| Chuck Martin (5 yrs) ||  ||  || ||
|-
| style="background: #e6e6e6; text-align:center;" colspan="5" | Jeff Bower (2013–2014)
|-
| 2013–14 || 12–19 || 9–11 ||  T-6th||
|-
| Jeff Bower (1 yr) ||  ||  || ||
|-
| style="background: #e6e6e6; text-align:center;" colspan="5" | Mike Maker (2014–2018)
|-
| 2014–15 || 7–25 || 5–15 ||  T-10th||
|-
| 2015–16 || 7–23 || 4–16 ||  11th||
|-
| 2016–17 || 8–24 || 5–15 ||  T-10th||
|-
| 2017–18 || 6–25 || 4–14 ||  T-10th||
|-
| Mike Maker (4 yrs) ||  ||  || ||
|-
| style="background: #e6e6e6; text-align:center;" colspan="5" | John Dunne (2018–present)
|-
| 2018–19 || 12–19 || 7–11 ||  8th||
|-
| 2019–20 || 7–23 || 6–14 ||  11th||
|-
| 2020–21 || 12–9 || 10–8 ||  T-3rd||
|-
| 2021–22 || 14–16 || 9–11 ||  T-5th||
|-
| 2022–23 || – || – ||  || 
|-
| John Dunne (4 yrs) ||  ||  || ||

Career Records
Active players in italics. * Updated through the 2021–22 season

Retired numbers

Conference Player-of-Year winners
 1983: Steve Smith (NEC)
 1987: Rik Smits (NEC)
 1988: Rik Smits (NEC)
 1994: Izett Buchanan (NEC)
 2007: Jared Jordan (MAAC)

Red Foxes currently in professional basketball
 Chavaughn Lewis (born 1993), for Hapoel Galil Elyon of the Israeli Basketball Premier League

Notable former players

 Jay Bowie
 Izett Buchanan
 Rik Smits
 Miroslav Pecarski
 Nick Eppehimer
 Bobby Joe Hatton
 Jared Jordan
 Adam Kemp
 Chavaughn Lewis

References

External links
 Official website